The News Forum is a Canadian English language news channel owned by The News Forum Inc., a group founded by Tore Stautland. The channel primarily broadcasts opinion-based talk shows, and has a conservative editorial position.

History 
The News Forum was founded by Tore Stautland, who previously worked for ZoomerMedia's Faith TV and Joytv. The network has officially described itself as being a centre-right outlet designed to provide "politically balanced domestic and international perspectives, inclusive of a conservative counterbalance for the current media landscape." Ethnic Channels Group was contracted to provide advertising and distribution services for the network. It launched with a three-month free preview on Bell Fibe TV and Bell Satellite TV on August 27, 2020. However, its presence went unnoticed by most Canadian media outlets until a trailer and press release announcing its launch was released on September 29.

As Stautland is not currently a Canadian citizen, his 22.25% equity stake in the network (shared with his wife Jule) is represented as a voting trust to comply with CRTC rules, as only Canadian citizens may hold broadcast licences. The trust will be dissolved if Stautland becomes a Canadian citizen. The remainder of the network is owned by a group of other unnamed shareholders. 92.3% of the network's ownership is held by Canadian interests.

The News Forum initially operated as an exempted discretionary service. In October 2021, The News Forum filed an application with the CRTC for formal licensing as a national news discretionary service, requiring that it be offered by all Canadian television providers as with CBC News Network and CTV News Channel.

On May 17, 2022, the CRTC granted a licence to The News Forum as a national news discretionary service, but declined its request for must-offer status since its schedule did not meet a quota for regularly-updated news programming. In July 2022, The News Forum submitted another application for must-offer status, which included a proposed schedule adding regular news updates between 6:00 a.m. and 8:00 p.m. ET daily. On November 1, 2022, the CRTC granted The News Forum's request for must-offer status, finding that its schedule now met the programming requirements for national news discretionary services.

Programming 
The channel's programming consists primarily of opinion-based talk shows, with its launch programs including personalities such as former Conservative Party minister Tony Clement (Boom and Bust), and former 2018 Ontario Progressive Conservative candidate Tanya Granic Allen (Counterpoint). Former Alberta Wildrose Party leader and CHQR host Danielle Smith, and Conservative MP Dean Allison, later joined the network. Former CHFD anchor Nima Rajan hosts Forum Daily, a national newscast drawn primarily from Canadian Press wire stories.

See also 

 Sun News Network

References

External links
 

24-hour television news channels in Canada
Television channels and stations established in 2020
Digital cable television networks in Canada
English-language television stations in Canada
2020 establishments in Canada
Conservative media in Canada